Despain is a surname. Notable people with the surname include:

 Bree Despain (born 1979), American author
 Don G. Despain (born 1940), American botanist, plant ecologist, and fire behavior specialist
 Dave Despain (born 1946), American motorsport journalist
 Michelle Despain (born 1984), Argentine-American luger